Argentina held a presidential election on Sunday, 27 April 2003. Turnout was 78.2%.  No one presidential candidate gained enough votes to win outright, but the scheduled runoff was cancelled when former president and first-round winner Carlos Menem pulled out, handing the presidency to runner-up, Santa Cruz Province Governor Néstor Kirchner of the Front for Victory. Legislative elections were held on 12 dates, 27 April, 24 August, 31 August, 7 September, 14 September, 28 September, 5 October, 19 October, 26 October, 9 November, 16 November and 23 November.

Background

For the first time since the return of democracy in 1983, the Justicialist Party (PJ) failed to agree on a single presidential candidate.  Three credible Peronist candidates ran in the election: center-right former President Carlos Menem, center-left Santa Cruz Province Governor Néstor Kirchner, and centrist  former president Adolfo Rodríguez Saá. None were officially supported by the party, though President Eduardo Duhalde publicly endorsed Governor Kirchner on January 15, 2003. The PJ suspended its January 24 convention, opting to allow the three contenders to run on the Peronist mantle.  None of the candidates were allowed to use the traditional Peronist iconography in detriment of the others.

For the first time since 1916, the UCR did not field a presidential candidate. After the political collapse at the peak of the economic crisis that led to the resignation of President Fernando de la Rúa at the end of 2001, popular support for the UCR was at historically low levels. Two strong former members of the UCR founded parties based on their politics: Congresswoman Elisa Carrió founded a left-of-center party, the ARI, and economist Ricardo López Murphy founded a right-wing one, Recreate for Growth.

These five strong candidates were practically tied in all the pre-election polls. Menem obtained the most votes in the first round, but far short of a first-round victory (about 25%), so a runoff election against Kirchner was required, and was scheduled for May 18. However, after two terms in office from 1989 to 1999, Menem's popularity remained very low.  All signs pointed to a record victory for Kirchner (polls showed him leading Menem by anywhere from a 35 to a 50% margin). Rather than face a humiliating defeat, Menem withdrew from the runoff on May 14, a move that was roundly criticized by the other candidates. The courts refused to authorize a new election, and also refused to sanction a runoff between Kirchner and López Murphy (though the latter let it be known he would not take part in any case).  Finally, Congress sanctioned Kirchner as president-elect, with the lowest vote share ever recorded for a president in a free election.

Legislative races
Legislative and gubernatorial elections were held throughout 2003, with polls open in different provinces between April and November; average turnout was 70.8%.

These elections were unprecedented in their staggered scheduling; indeed, legislators and governors were chosen over 12 different dates, during 2003. They were also, however, a return to political normalcy following a chaotic and economically depressed 2002.

The Justicialist Party, which was divided among three candidates in the presidential race, remained largely united in legislative and local races. They added 12 seats in the Argentine Chamber of Deputies, as well as 2 governorships, and fears of a high number of dissident tickets did not materialize.

The centrist Radical Civic Union, senior partners in the ill-fated Alliance that had returned them to power in 1999, were left with their smallest representation since 1954, though they were not replaced by the center-left ARI in a significant way; the ARI added but 2 Congressmen.

Voters sentiment improved over 2001 levels (when the sentiment among many was that "they should all go"), though not significantly. Turnout increased only modestly, and the use of invalid votes declined from 24% to 15% from the tense 2001 elections. Voters in the important Santa Fe Province, in particular, curbed their use of spoiled ballots from 30% to 20%.

Kirchner ended 2003 on a more secure footing than before these local and legislative elections. He benefited from allies such as the new governor of the paramount Buenos Aires Province, Felipe Solá, as well as the Mayor of Buenos Aires, Aníbal Ibarra. Argentina celebrated 20 years of continuous democratic rule on December 10, 2003, with a new government carrying generous numbers of allies in Congress and the provinces, as well as voters' high expectations.

Results

President

Chamber of Deputies

Senate

Governors and Mayor of Buenos Aires

Provincial officials in all districts except Corrientes Province, were elected, as well as the Chief of Government of the City of Buenos Aires. The Justicialist Party wrested two governorships from the UCR (Chubut and Entre Ríos Provinces), and the UCR recovered Tierra del Fuego from the Justicialists.

Notes

References

Results 

 
 
 
 
 
 
 
 
 
 
 
 
 
 
 
 
 
 
 
 
 
 
 
 
 
 
 

2003
Argentina
Presidency of Néstor Kirchner
2003